BBC Look North is the BBC's regional television news service for West, South and North Yorkshire and northern parts of Nottinghamshire and Derbyshire. The service is produced and broadcast from the BBC Broadcasting Centre at St. Peter's Square in Leeds with district newsrooms based in Bradford, Sheffield and York.

Look North can be watched in any part of the UK (and Europe) from Astra 2E on Freesat channel 966 and Sky channel 956. The latest edition of Look North is also available to watch on the BBC iPlayer.

Coverage area 

The Leeds programme covers the editorial areas of Radio Leeds and Radio Sheffield. Due to the size of North Yorkshire, the listenership of Radio York is covered by the geographically multitudinous Look North programmes from Leeds and Newcastle.

The programme is available online through BBC iPlayer. In some (but not all) areas of North Yorkshire, impacted viewers may be able to re-point their aerial to the Emley Moor or Oliver's Mount Transmitter to watch the Leeds edition of Look North. Most viewers in Scarborough and some in Filey and Bridlington receive the Leeds edition from the relay transmitter at Oliver's Mount and in some cases, the Hull edition for East Yorkshire and Lincolnshire.

For viewers on Freesat, northern areas of North Yorkshire (DL, TS, and YO21/22 postcodes) are allocated Look North from Newcastle on BBC1 and ITV News Tyne Tees. YO7 and YO62 postcodes are allocated BBC Yorkshire and ITV Tyne Tees news services.

Broadcast 

On weekdays, Look North in Yorkshire and the North Midlands broadcasts three main bulletins: a 15-minute lunchtime news at 1.30 pm, the main half-hour programme at 6.30 pm and a 15-minute late bulletin at 10.30 pm, following the BBC News at Ten, with a 30-second headline update during the BBC News Summary at 8 pm.

Look North also airs three bulletins during the weekend: early evening bulletins on Saturday & Sunday and a late night bulletin on Sundays, following the BBC News at Ten. The times of these bulletins usually vary.

Breakfast bulletins during BBC Breakfast aired at 27 and 57 minutes past each hour until Monday 6 June 2016, when the opt-outs were merged with those provided by Look North'''s sister service in East Yorkshire and Lincolnshire, as part of a pilot scheme from the BBC's Hull studios. These bulletins now come from the BBC's Leeds studios.

 History 
Before 1968, the region was served by regional output from Manchester, launched in September 1957 with daily News from the North bulletins for the entire north of England.
The start of a separate programme for the North East & Cumbria in 1959 allowed the daily bulletins to focus on the North West and Yorkshire & Lincolnshire areas. The programme was extended to 20 minutes in 1962 and renamed North at Six (later Look North).
BBC regional television from Leeds has been broadcast since Monday 25 March 1968.

The launch of a dedicated regional news service from Leeds allowed for greater coverage of the two distinct areas on each side of the Pennines. It also coincided with the decision to introduce a separate ITV contractor for the east of the Pennines, Yorkshire Television, which went on air in July 1968 along with its own regional news magazine, Calendar. Prior to that, Yorkshire had been covered by the Manchester-based contractors ABC (weekends) and Granada (weekdays).

The original team of Look North presenters and reporters from Leeds included John Burns, Barry Chambers, David Haigh, James Hogg and David Seymour.

Because the Leeds programme was carried on the powerful Holme Moss transmitter, it could be received in the north-west, Isle of Man, south to near Birmingham and even in parts of Northern Ireland as viewers' correspondence often testified (the Manchester programme was carried from Winter Hill and restricted to the north-west).Look North from Leeds was the main programme for the whole of the 'BBC North' (later 'Yorkshire & Lincolnshire') region until 11 November 2002, when a new studio had been built in Hull, and the programme split in two. A short opt-out service for the East Yorkshire and Lincolnshire had been in service since 2001.
The programme was first produced from All Souls' Church in Blackman Lane, Leeds, where part of the church had been converted into a black-and-white television studio with attendant equipment.

In 1974, Look North moved to new studios at Broadcasting House on Woodhouse Lane near Leeds Metropolitan University and around the corner from All Souls Church. The new facilities, equipped for colour, remained the base for Look North Leeds and other regional programmes until 26 September 2004.

A new broadcasting centre was built near the West Yorkshire Playhouse on St Peter's Square, with BBC Look North moving into the new premises on 27 September 2004. The move coincided with the introduction of a new BBC region for Yorkshire and the North Midlands.

 Former on air team 

 Christa Ackroyd – (2001–2013)
 John Cundy – (1991–2018) news correspondent for 27 years
 Harry Gration – (1982–1995, 1999–2020)
 Will Hanrahan – (1986–1987) later reporter for BBC Watchdog and Good Morning with Anne and Nick''
 Len Tingle – (2001–2018) political editor 2001-2018
 Ian White – (1997–2022)

References

External links 
 

BBC Regional News shows
1960s British television series
1970s British television series
1980s British television series
1990s British television series
2000s British television series
2010s British television series
2020s British television series
1968 British television series debuts
English-language television shows
Television news in England
Television news program articles using incorrect naming style